Joseph George Lustig (October 21, 1925 – May 29, 1999) was an American music entrepreneur.

Early career
Jo was born on October 21, 1925 in Brooklyn, New York. At the age of 12 he saw Billie Holiday singing in a club and fell in love with music.  He became an apprentice music journalist, meeting up with Gloria Swanson and Mel Brooks. Having gone solo, he handled publicity for Miles Davis, Dave Brubeck and others. After touring Europe with Nat “King” Cole in 1960, he decided to relocate to London.

Anglo-American folk music 

In 1962 American folk singer Julie Felix decided to hitch-hike around Europe. In 1964 she finally arrived in Britain. Jo Lustig saw her potential and offered to become her agent. When Decca signed Julie Felix it was the first time a British label acquired a major folk artist. Lustig promoted her to record an album and a single (“Someday soon”) and an appearance on the Eamonn Andrews TV show. She was the first British-based folk singer to fill the Albert Hall.  In 1965 when Nico met Lustig at a party hosted by the co-producer of the Bond films, she said “I want to be a singer”.  A few weeks later she was on “Ready Steady Go”, singing her first single, thanks to Jo.
However, she was not successful, and in 1966 joined Andy Warhol at The Factory.

British folk music 

In 1968 Lustig spotted “The Pentangle”. In 1969 he gave them one of the first mystery album sleeves – a silhouette of the band (see The Pentangle). The cover of their second album Sweet Child was designed by Peter Blake, creator  of The Beatles "Sgt. Pepper cover. Lustig also brought Pentangle a U.S. concert tour beginning in February 1969 at the Fillmore East.

In 1970 Ralph McTell changed his manager Bruce May for Jo Lustig. In October he was able to fill the Royal Festival Hall. In 1972 Robin and Barry Dransfield's “Lord of all I Behold” was Melody Maker's Folk Album of the Year. Jo eagerly read the pop press and signed them up, even before the album was released. The two brothers were then signed to Warner Brothers in America, and were off on a big concert tour supporting another Lustig act, Ralph McTell. Unfortunately the brothers not only quarrelled with each other but Barry seemed to be psychologically unable to handle large-scale commercial fame. Jo tore up the contract in disgust. This gives a hint of how impatient and short-tempered Jo Lustig was. By the end of the 1972 McTell had also broken with Jo Lustig. Ralph's brother Bruce was in charge again. It is perhaps surprising that Jo never managed Donovan, the biggest of all British folk artists. The reason is that Mickie Most got there first, and managed Donovan well. Another casualty of Jo's aggressive publicity-seeking approach was Anne Briggs, who was so disgusted that she gave up singing altogether, citing Jo as one of the reasons. Shel Talmy described him as “one of my most unfavourite people”.

Steeleye Span 

After the departure of Martin Carthy and Ashley Hutchings, Steeleye Span were eager for commercial success. They sacked Sandy Roberton and signed up with Jo Lustig. He brought them a lucrative contract with Chrysalis, and lavish studio time. Within a year they had a hit, “Gaudete”. Somewhere along the line, Jo Lustig managed Irish harpist Mary O'Hara, who emerged after a decade in a convent to become a popular easy listening act. He also managed folk singer Richard Digance and, for a while, Jethro Tull (during the "Songs from the Wood" period). In 1974, the Chieftains were still semi-professional, despite having released “Chieftains 4” in 1974, to worldwide praise. In 1975 they became full-time musicians and took Jo Lustig as their manager. He brought them a contract with a major label, Island Records.  By 1982 Richard and Linda Thompson were also managed by Jo, but it is not clear when this started. About 1980 Jo Lustig created his own record label called Luggage, but only one act is known to have appeared in it – the Home Service. Jo financed the first Home Service single in 1981.  Despite containing talented musicians, the Home Service were not commercially successful. Perhaps this was the reason that he gave up folk bands, and became a film producer.

Lustig in films 

In 1985 Jo produced The Doctor and the Devils a historical thriller. In 1987 there came his best-known venture, 84 Charing Cross Road, in which he was associate producer. In 1989 he started to specialise in television documentaries about musicians, starting with The Unforgettable Nat 'King'''. Blondes: Anita Ekberg was also in 1999. Diana Dors was on television in 1999. Maria Callas : life and art'' (1999) was produced by Jo for video release. He died of cancer on May 29, 1999 in Cambridge, England.

Music promoters
Businesspeople from Brooklyn
Film producers from New York (state)
1925 births
1999 deaths
20th-century American businesspeople
Women music promoters
20th-century American businesswomen